The sacking of Burhanpur (31 January 1681 - 2 February 1681) refers to the looting of the wealthy city of Burhanpur in Madhya Pradesh by the Maratha ruler Sambhaji. The Maratha army commanded by Sambhaji and Hambirrao Mohite attacked and plundered the city for three days. The Marathas got a huge loot and returned to Raigad by evading Mughal forces.Marathas also sacked aurangabad after this sack.

Background 
Sambhaji ascended to throne after the death of his father Shivaji in 1680. He was crowned on 16 January 1681 at the  Raigad Fort. His coronation ceremony was attended by more than 50,000 people. A large amount of money was spent on the function, and Sambhaji wanted to replenish his depleted treasury.

The Mughal emperor Aurangzeb had finished his campaign in Rajputana and was preparing for a full-scale invasion of the Deccan Plateau. Sambhaji knew that the Maratha Empire was heading into a sustained conflict against the overwhelmingly larger Mughal Empire. He wanted to fill the Maratha treasury before the arrival of Aurangzeb in Deccan. Sambhaji also wanted to gain a psychological edge over his opponent Aurangzeb by scoring the first victory.

The first campaign of the Chhatrapati thus began in his father’s style. On May, 1680, Aurangzeb had sent for the second time Khan Jahan, formerly known as Bahadur Khan Koka, as viceroy to the Deccan. His first tenure of office in 1672 was such a failure that he allowed Shivaji to extort tribute from the Golconda Sultanate unchallenged. In order to prove himself to his liege this time, Khan Jahan besieged the Maratha garrison at Ahivant, a fort in the Chandod range, which had been taken by Shivaji just some months prior. He failed in the attempt and the lateness of the season prevented further hostilities, but Sambhaji sent the Mughal general a challenge to battle him in the open field after the rains had abated. 
At the Dasara festival, early in October, 1680, the Maratha horse in three divisions moved out to culminate the Maratha sovereign’s threat. One division moved towards Surat, one into Khandesh, a third skirmished with the imperial Mughal troops near Khan Jahan’s camp at Aurangabad. These operations however were subordinate to Sambhaji's design of celebrating his accession by the sack of a great Mughal city.

Immediately after his coronation, the Chhatrapati collected the three contingents and set out as if to plunder the Berar province. Suddenly turning back, he led his troops by forced marches to Burhanpur, the capital of Khandesh and the wealthiest town in the Deccan viceroyalty.

Maratha Plan 
Sambhaji called a strategic meeting of his advisors and senior generals at Raigad, just after his coronation. Sambhaji and Maratha generals decided to attack and plunder Burhanpur as it was an important trading center and a very rich city. The distance between Raigad Fort and  Burhanpur was more than 500 kilometres. The city was heavily fortified and guarded by a force of 8,000.

Sambhaji had got the news that Bahadur Khan Kokaltash, the Subedar of Burhanpur was going to Aurangabad for his nephew's wedding with a girl from the royal family of Abul Hasan Qutb Shah. Bahadurkhan took a force 3,000 with him for the wedding. Hence Burhanpur was left with an army of 5,000 under Bahadurkhan's deputy Kakar Khan. Sambhaji decided to further bifurcate the force at Burhanpur by feigning a move to attack Surat, forcing the Mughals at Burhanpur to send reinforcement to Surat, which had been sacked by Shivaji twice before.

Sacking of Burhanpur 
Hambirrao Mohite reached the forests near Burhanpur with a 15,000 strong cavalry force. Kakar Khan gathered civilian forces and decided to attack Hambirrao at midnight. As he came out of the city gates, Sambhaji himself attacked from the old trenches with a cavalry force of 4,000. Sambhaji's force routed the ill-prepared Mughal garrison. Sambhaji then left 200-300 soldiers at the main city gate and left for Bahadurpura, the richest suburb of the city. Sambhaji started to loot the houses of the richest merchants which were shown to him by his spies. Hambirrao's force soon joined Sambhaji and the combined Maratha force started looting the city. Hambirrao, then sealed the city's entrances to ensure that the word of the attack doesn't spread out. Marathas looted the city consecutively for three days. Marathas earned a loot estimated to be around 2 crore rupees. The Marathas also captured the city fort and arrested Kakar Khan.

Bahadurkhan got the news and immediately left Aurangabad with a large army to save Burhanpur. When Marathas heard this they immediately fled the city, as they were far away from Maratha territory.

Withdrawal of Maratha forces 
Sambhaji left Burhanpur and started marching towards Raigad. Bahadurkhan left Aurangabad with a force of around 20,000 to seize the loot back from the Marathas. Sambhaji divided his forces into three divisions.

There were two routes to reach Raigad, a shorter one via Dharangao-Chopda and a longer one via Erandol. Bahadurkhan was waiting for Sambhaji's forces at the first route.  Sambhaji's first division under Mulla Kazi Haider disguised as envoys took this route. Bahadurkhan arrested them all but they convinced him that Sambhaji would choose the longer route to avoid his forces. After some time the second division of Maratha force consisting of 3,000 soldiers passed via the same route without any loot. Bahadurkhan did not attack them as he was concerned with securing the loot. Bahadurkhan was convinced after seeing this force that Sambhaji has opted for the longer route and left for Erandol. Three hours after Bahadurkhan had left the first route, the entire remaining Maratha army (Third division) took the loot via the same Dharangaon-Chopda route towards the Maratha stronghold of Salher. And the Marathas reached Raigad shortly thereafter.

Meanwhile, Bahadurkhan had left Aurangabad hastily with a large army leaving only few soldiers in Aurangabad. Seeing this opportunity a Maratha sardar named Suryaji Jakhde attacked Aurangabad with a force of 7,000 via Paithan. Bahadurkhan immediately rushed to Aurangabad via Fardapur and Suryaji Jakhde had to retreat from the city.

Assassination attempt on Sambhaji 
Aurangzeb had stationed a few of his elite horsemen called Ahadi, in every important Mughal city. Their job was to locate and kill the leader of enemy forces in case of an attack. When Sambhaji left Burhanpur for Raigad, five Ahadi horsemen from Burhanpur started to chase the returning Maratha army. Sambhaji went to Vani with a small force to visit Saptashringi temple, and was attacked, but he managed to kill the 5 assassins in the fight.

References 

Military history of India
Wars involving India
17th-century conflicts
Wars involving the Mughal Empire
17th century in India
Conflicts in 1681
Battles fought by Marathas under Sambhaji